Rock Lake is a lake in Lyon County, in the U.S. state of Minnesota.

Rock Lake was named for the large boulders found in and around the lake.

See also
List of lakes in Minnesota

References

Lakes of Minnesota
Lakes of Lyon County, Minnesota